Igor Bukhman (born 29 March 1982) is a Russian-born Israeli entrepreneur. Together with his brother Dmitry Bukhman, they founded online gaming company Playrix, which is best known for its mobile-app games such as Homescapes and Fishdom.

Igor and his brother Dmitry were born in Vologda. Since he was a kid, Igor was engaged in programming. In 2001, together with his brother, they started developing online games. The same year, they published their first game Discovera. The brothers priced it at $15, uploaded it to 200 app directories, and made $60 in the first month. They founded Playrix in 2004. By that time, they had released three games and around 30 screensavers; by 2007, the number of games increased to 16, and the company's monthly income constituted around $. Soon the company released such games as Homescapes, Gardenscapes, Fishdom, and Township. In 2014, he moved to Dublin. In 2016, he acquired Israeli citizenship.

In 2018, they personally invested in video and social network games developer Nexters Global and in Belarusian Vizor Games. In 2019, Playrix bought the Armenian and Serbian studios Plexonic and Eipix Entertainment, respectively.

Igor Bukhman made the 2022 Forbes Billionaires List with an estimated wealth of $8.1 billion and occupied the 275th position.

References 

1982 births
Living people
Israeli businesspeople
Russian businesspeople in the United Kingdom
Russian activists against the 2022 Russian invasion of Ukraine